Trichoptilus archaeodes is a moth of the family Pterophoridae that can be found in India.

References

Moths described in 1913
Oxyptilini
Endemic fauna of India
Moths of Asia
Taxa named by Edward Meyrick